Tomorrow Hit Today is the fifth studio album by the grunge band Mudhoney. It was released by Reprise Records on September 22, 1998 (see 1998 in music). Barely selling 11,000 copies on its release this would be the last album the band would release with Reprise as well as a major label. Although the band retains their grunge sound on the album, a noticeable garage and blues influence can be heard. The album title is a reference to a song, "When Tomorrow Hits", off of their eponymous debut. This is also the last album to feature bass player Matt Lukin.
The album was released on CD through Reprise and on Vinyl through Superelectro Sound Recordings. The album also gained a cassette release on the Philippines. 
In 2018, the album got a re-release on blue vinyl to celebrate its 20th anniversary.

Track listing
All tracks composed by Mudhoney, except where noted:
 "A Thousand Forms of Mind" – 4:43
 "I Have to Laugh" – 3:29
 "Oblivion" – 3:26
 "Try to Be Kind" – 2:55
 "Poisoned Water" – 2:45
 "Real Low Vibe" – 2:55
 "This Is the Life" – 3:32
 "Night of the Hunted" – 3:05
 "Move with the Wind" – 3:49
 "Ghost" (Cheater Slicks) – 4:33
 "I Will Fight No More Forever" – 2:54
 "Beneath the Valley of the Underdog" – 5:16

Personnel

Band
 Mark Arm - vocals, guitar, organ
 Steve Turner - guitar
 Matt Lukin - bass guitar
 Dan Peters - drums, percussion

Additional musicians
 Jim Dickinson - keyboards, producer.

References

Mudhoney albums
1998 albums
Reprise Records albums
Albums produced by Jim Dickinson